HMS Morris Dance has been the name of several Royal Navy vessels of the 20th century:

 , a Dance-class minesweeper of World War I
 , a Dance-class trawler of World War II

See also
 Morris dance, an English folk dance 
 , an Admiralty M-class destroyer launched in 1914

Royal Navy ship names